Calcraft is a surname. Notable people with the surname include:

Granby Hales Calcraft
Granby Thomas Calcraft, British soldier and politician
John Calcraft, English army agent and politician
John Calcraft (the younger)
Thomas Calcraft
William Calcraft, English hangman

Surnames of English origin